The 1944 United States presidential election in South Carolina took place on November 7, 1944, as part of the 1944 United States presidential election. State voters chose 8 electors to the Electoral College, which selected the president and vice president.

Background
For six decades South Carolina had been a one-party state dominated by the Democratic Party. The Republican Party had been moribund due to the disfranchisement of blacks and the complete absence of other support bases as the Palmetto State completely lacked upland or German refugee whites opposed to secession. Between 1900 and 1940, no Republican presidential candidate had obtained more than seven percent of the total presidential vote – a vote which in 1924 reached as low as 6.6% of the total voting-age population (or approximately 15% of the voting-age white population).

By the time of the 1944 election, however, questions were emerging within the state Democratic Party following the landmark court case of Smith v. Allwright earlier in the year and support for black civil rights by incumbent Vice-President Henry A. Wallace. The liberal drift of the national party on economic issues also worried Southern White Democrats. Although the South did succeed in replacing Wallace on the ticket by border state Democrat Harry S. Truman, for some this was an inadequate compromise, and consequently a slate of “unpledged electors” were placed on the ballot in South Carolina – in the process foreshadowing the Dixiecrat bolt that would begin in the following election to completely transform the state's politics.

Vote
Despite fears of what the national Democratic Party might do to the social structure of the South, FDR remained extremely popular in the region. His renomination was supported by over eighty percent of those polled in 1943. Consequently, South Carolina was won by Roosevelt over New York governor Thomas E. Dewey by a landslide margin of 83.18%. The unpledged slate of anti-Roosevelt Southern Democrats received a moderate 7.54% of the vote, doing best among the wealthy planter class in the lowcountry. , this constitutes the last election in which Lexington County voted for a Democratic presidential candidate. This was also the first time that Dillon County voted less than 90% for any Democratic candidate.

Results

Results by county

Notes

References

1944
South Carolina
1944 South Carolina elections